Senator Townsend may refer to:

Members of the United States Senate
Charles E. Townsend (1856–1924), U.S. Senator from Michigan from 1911 to 1923
John G. Townsend Jr. (1871–1964), U.S. Senator from Delaware from 1929 to 1941

United States state senate members
Bryan Townsend (American politician) (born 1981), Delaware State Senate
Charles Townsend (Ohio politician) (1834–1900), Ohio State Senate
Fred Townsend (1862–1918), Iowa State Senate
John Townsend (New York City) (1789–1863), New York State Senate
Manly B. Townsend (1803–1849), Maine State Senate
Randolph Townsend (born 1947), Nevada State Senate
Wayne Townsend (1926–2015), Indiana State Senate
William Townsend (Oneida County, NY) (1848–1919), New York State Senate

See also
Norton Strange Townshend (1815–1895), Ohio State Senate